Getafe Club de Fútbol, or simply Getafe, is a professional football club based in Getafe, a city in the Community of Madrid. The team competes in La Liga, the highest tier of the Spanish football system. The club's home stadium (owned and operated by the municipality) is Coliseum Alfonso Pérez which was opened in 1998 and can hold 17,393 spectators. The club was founded in 1946 and refounded in 1983.

Since promoting to La Liga for the first time in 2004, Getafe participated in the top level of Spanish football for twelve years between 2004 and 2016, and again since 2017.

The club's main rivalry is against neighbours Leganés, who are based near the town of Getafe, and a friendly rivalry against Atlético Madrid and Real Madrid.

History

Beginnings
Sociedad Getafe Deportivo was founded in 1923, only playing in lower divisions from 1928 to 1932. After the Spanish Civil War, in 1945 five Getafe locals – Enrique Condes García, Aurelio Miranda Olavaria, Antonio Corridor Lozano, Manuel Serrano Vergara and Miguel Cubero Francés – while meeting at La Marquesina bar, decided to form a local team. Officially founded on 24 February 1946, the club was named Club Getafe Deportivo.

The club originally played in the Campo del Regimiento de Artillería, which lacked goal posts. Shortly after, the club moved to San Isidro, housed in the current Municipal Sports Center of San Isidro. Here, Club Getafe was promoted to the third division following their victory against Villarrobledo in the 1956–57 season. Getafe was nearly promoted to the Segunda División in 1957–58, but was defeated by CA Almería.

On 2 September 1970, the club inaugurated its own stadium after being promoted back to the Tercera División. Presided by chairman Francisco Vara, Las Margaritas won a 3–1 victory over Michelín. The team survived in the third level that season, and six years later gained their first promotion to the second division.

Second Division
Club Getafe Deportivo played six seasons in the Segunda División, with little success. From 1976 to 1982, they placed below tenth level all six years.

In 1978, the club advanced to play against Barcelona in the Copa del Rey round of 16. Playing at home in the first leg, Getafe drew with a star-studded Barcelona team 3–3, before traveling away for the second leg and being thrashed 8–0 at the Camp Nou.

At the conclusion of the 1981–82 season, players having not been paid, Getafe was automatically relegated and subsequently liquidated.

Meanwhile, on 1 September 1976, a new club was founded in the National Sports Council and the Regional Federation of Castille. The club was called Peña Madridista Getafe (the "Real Madrid supporters' club of Getafe"). This club played for four seasons in various divisions, until taking the name Club Deportivo Peña Getafe, and played under this name for a further two seasons. On 10 July 1982, they joined forces with the much older Club Getafe Promesas, and were registered again in the Regional Federation of Castille.

Present existence
Based on the merger the previous year, the present Getafe Club de Fútbol was officially founded on 8 July 1983, after passing through assembly.

Starting in the regional leagues in 1983–84, Getafe was promoted for four consecutive seasons until reaching the Segunda División B. The club started a new period with its promotion into Segunda in 1994–95, staying only two years. Threatening absolute disappearance just a few years later in 1997, Getafe survived relegation into the fourth level Tercera División following a two-legged playoff victory over Huesca.

Meanwhile, Getafe's current stadium, the Coliseum Alfonso Pérez, was inaugurated on 1 January 1998.

Returning to the second division for 1999–2000, Getafe lasted another two seasons. However, one year later, they would return following an amazing promotion in 2001–02 during which one of their players, Sebastián "Sebas" Gómez, was murdered, and controversy regarding unpaid payments of players following a debt of €3 million.

Consolidating their position after one year, Getafe had a fantastic season in Segunda. At the top of the table for most of the year, the side travelled to the Canary Islands on the final matchday needing a win to assure a historic promotion to La Liga, the top-flight. Amazingly, they defeated Tenerife 5–3 with five goals from Sergio Pachón, thus becoming along with Real Madrid, Atlético Madrid and Rayo Vallecano the fourth team from the Community of Madrid – and the first of them from outside of the capital – to ever play in La Liga. With this promotion, Getafe had ascended the whole Spanish football pyramid, achieving this feat in only 20 years.

La Liga

The club started 2004–05 poorly, lying at the bottom of the table. Home wins over Espanyol, Athletic Bilbao, Valencia and Real Madrid, followed by a sole away win of the season over Athletic Bilbao, saw Getafe climb to finish 13th, being the only promoted side to avoid relegation. At the end of the season, the club lost head coach Quique Sánchez Flores and several players to rival clubs. In Getafe's next season, the club briefly topped the table before slipping to finish ninth. During the 2006 FIFA World Cup, Argentine-born Mariano Pernía became Getafe's first ever Spanish international, before moving to Atlético Madrid.

In 2006–07, Getafe again finished ninth in the league, conceding only 33 goals in 38 matches and goalkeeper Roberto Abbondanzieri was awarded the Zamora Trophy, having recorded 12 clean sheets. The highlight of the club's season was reaching the 2006–07 Copa del Rey final, a competition in which Getafe had never reached the quarter-finals before. The run included a two-legged semi-final against Barcelona in which Getafe lost the first leg 5–2 at the Camp Nou before producing a 4–0 rout in the second leg at the Coliseum Alfonso Pérez. Getafe lost their first ever major final 1–0 to Sevilla at the Santiago Bernabéu Stadium. Through this, the club qualified for the following season's UEFA Cup qualification, as Sevilla had already qualified for the UEFA Champions League through their league position.

The following season, coach Bernd Schuster left after two seasons to become head coach at Real Madrid, and Getafe appointed Michael Laudrup as his replacement. Under Laudrup, Getafe again finished the league mid-table. In the UEFA Cup, the team managed to progress to the quarter-finals after finishing top of Group G, only losing once, setting up a tie against four-time European Cup winners Bayern Munich. Getafe drew the away leg 1–1, thanks to an injury time equaliser from Cosmin Contra. In the second leg, Rubén de la Red was sent off after six minutes. Contra put Getafe ahead just before half-time, but in the 89th minute, Franck Ribéry equalized to send the match into extra time. Two quick goals from Javier Casquero and substitute Braulio gave Getafe a 3–1 lead, but Bayern pulled a goal back from Luca Toni, before Toni again scored seconds before the end of extra time, giving Bayern an away goals win. Getafe also had successful run in the Copa del Rey, reaching the final for a second year running. In the final, at the Vicente Calderón Stadium, Getafe were beaten 3–1 by Valencia.

In the 2015–16 season, Getafe were relegated to second division after spending 12 years in first campaign. However, in 2016–17, the club immediately returned to La Liga after defeating Huesca and Tenerife to gain promotion via the play-offs. In the 2017–18 season Getafe finished in the 8th position, easily avoiding the relegation back to Segunda División.

2019–present  
In the 2018–19 season Getafe finished 5th, their highest finish in the first division, and qualified for the 2019–20 UEFA Europa League group stage. They finished 2nd in their group, with 12 points from 6 games, which allowed them to advance to the next round. They managed to beat Ajax 3–2 on aggregate in the Round of 32. Due to that win, they faced Inter Milan in the round of 16, where their European dream ended with a 2–0 loss.

Stadium

Getafe play at the Coliseum Alfonso Pérez, located in Getafe. Its pitch dimensions are 105x70 metres. The stadium was inaugurated on 1 January 1998, named after the Spanish international (and of Real Madrid fame) Alfonso Pérez. Though he never played for or against Getafe, or even in the stadium, he is perhaps the most famous footballer to come out of the area and was at the height of his career during the mid-1990s.

Before playing in the Coliseum, Getafe played their home matches at the nearby Estadio de las Margaritas, part of the greater Sports City of Las Margaritas. The Coliseum was subsequently built as a natural extension to the much smaller facilities at Las Margaritas. Since its foundation, the stadium has had numerous renovations, and now seats 14,400 people and several thousand more standing. As such, the exact capacity is variable and ambiguous. Getafe generally fill the stadium for local matches against Real and Atlético Madrid, as well as against Barcelona, most famously in the 2006–07 Cup semi-final. For the first time in their history, Getafe pre-sold out the whole of the Coliseum before their second leg match against Bayern Munich in the UEFA Cup quarter-final.

Getafe club president Ángel Torres expressed interest in upgrading the Coliseum to a much greater 20,000 seat arena, in conjunction with Madrid's bid for the 2012 Olympic Games. The failure of this bid and poor crowd averages put this redevelopment in doubt.

Getafe use the nearby Sports City when training. These facilities include several training pitches with both grass and artificial turf, full medical rooms and recuperation facilities.

Supporters
Commonly called Marea Azul, or Azulones, Getafe supporters have steadily increased in number with the success of the team in recent years. There are 18 peñas ("supporter clubs") and 12,000 socios ("associates"). Former Real Madrid player Francisco Pavón is a well-known Getafe socio, while Fernando Alonso and Rafael Nadal have attended matches at the Coliseum in the past.

Getafe supporters have grown far beyond the local area and are now known to have fans in Australia, Sweden, Finland, Czech Republic, Argentina, Scotland, Denmark, the United States and Mexico. In 2007, a peña was founded in Venezuela to extend the worldwide club reach.

Getafe also created some controversy in 2007 when their season ticket campaign included biblical references of Abraham, Moses and Jesus sacrificing themselves for the team. The club responded by withdrawing the first scene involving Abraham.

Upon important or famous victories, Getafe fans congregate to celebrate at the Cibelina statue in the town centre. Prior to the 2007 Cup final, Torres implored the fans to "tear down the Cibelina" upon victory, promising to pay for a new design. During that final, thousands of supporters rushed to get tickets and packed into the Santiago Bernabéu, yet were vastly outnumbered by Sevillistas. However, those who failed to get tickets – most of which went to season ticket holders for the 2007–08 campaign – were able to watch the match on a big screen in Getafe's central square.

Getafe has also a small group of Ultras supporters, called Comandos Azules ("blue commandos").

Zombies Calientes de Getafe
In 2011, Getafe released a humorous tongue-in-cheek advertising campaign, pretending to decry the club's relatively small fanbase and encouraging male supporters to donate sperm in order to breed more fans.  To inspire those donations, the club produced a short pornographic film called "Zombies Calientes de Getafe" (Horny Zombies of Getafe), "shot in the style of a 1970s porn film", and delivered it to sperm donation clinics in Madrid.

Rivalries
Historically, due to their close geographical position, Getafe has always held a strong rivalry with Leganés. They played out numerous encounters in the lower division before the two teams fortunes began to contrast as Getafe gained ascendency and Leganés began to deteriorate.

In the first division, the side has held some exciting matches in the last few years with Real Madrid, with the ledger being most recently squared at three wins each. Real Madrid's much greater stature, huge budget and expensive squad has never stopped Getafe from rising to the challenge and often playing their best football against their "bigger brother".

In addition to this, Getafe has developed somewhat of a rivalry with Barcelona, which culminated in their famous 4–0 victory over their more fancied opponents during the 2006–07 Copa del Rey semi-final. Also, Valencia has succumbed numerous times to el Geta, often quite heavily, as was the case during the 2006–07 Copa del Rey, which ensured Getafe's first ever appearance in the Copa's quarter-finals with a 2–4 win at Valencia's Mestalla Stadium. However, this result was turned around in the 2008 Copa del Rey final, as Valencia would deny Getafe their first ever trophy with a 3–1 victory. This rivalry is propped up healthily by the regular transfer of Getafe players (and head coach Quique Sánchez Flores) to Valencia.

European record
The club has not appeared in any European competition except in the UEFA Europa League (formerly the UEFA Cup).

The club appeared only three times in this tournament, In 2007–08 they qualified for the tournament as Copa del Rey runner-up in the previous season's for Sevilla, who qualified for the UEFA Champions League, and progressed from the first round, group stage, round of 32 and round of 16 before being beaten by Bayern Munich in the quarter-finals. three years later, in 2010–11 they were paired with APOEL in the playoff round, and qualified by eliminating them, but then they were eliminated from the group stage as third place.

In the 2019–20 season, Getafe appeared in the tournament for the third time, and they were able to qualify from the group stage in second place, and they also managed to pass the round of 32 after eliminating Ajax, but they were eliminated in the next round against Inter Milan in one match due to the COVID-19 pandemic.

Season to season

18 seasons in La Liga
7 seasons in Segunda División
11 seasons in Segunda División B
1 seasons in Tercera División
3 seasons in Categorías Regionales

Honours
Copa del Rey
Runners-up (2): 2006–07, 2007–08
Segunda División B – Group 1
Winners (1): 1998–99

Current squad

.

Reserve team

Out on loan

Club officials

Current technical staff 

 David Cubillo Cote Santos Ramírez
 Cris Oyola
 Xabier Laucirica Zorrozua

Board of directors 
{| class="wikitable"
|-
!Office
!Name
|-
| President
| Ángel Torres
|-
| First vice president
| Felipe Triguero
|-
| Second vice president
| Valentín Sánchez
|-
| Secretary
| Juan Leif
|-
| Vice secretary
| Fernando Santos
|-
| Treasurer
| María Ángeles Carlos Vara
|-
| General director
| José María Durán
|-
| Sporting director
| Carlos Guerrero
|-
| Academy director
| Damián Jiménez Fraile
|-
| Academy coordinator
| Juan Manuel Hernández Cáceres
|-
| Administration and operations director
| José Antonio Ramirez
|-
| Financial director
| Angeles Carlos
|-
| Financial treasurer
| Patricia Torres
|-
| Communication director
| Luz Monzón
|-
| Social media director
| David Torres
|-
| Marketing director
| Alberto Heras

Coaches

Presidents
 Antonio de Miguel (1983–92)
 Francisco Flores (1992–2000)
 Felipe González (2000–01)
 Domingo Rebosio (2001–02)
 Ángel Torres (2002–)

See also
 Getafe CF B
 Getafe Deportivo

References

External links

Official websites
Official website 
Getafe at La Liga 
Futbolme team profile 
BDFutbol team profile
Peñas federation 

 
Association football clubs established in 1983
Football clubs in the Community of Madrid
1983 establishments in Spain
Sport in Getafe
La Liga clubs
Segunda División clubs